Víctor Sánchez del Amo (born 23 February 1976) is a Spanish football manager and former player who played as a right midfielder.

His crossing ability was among the qualities which brought him international recognition with Spain, and especially Deportivo. He started his career with Real Madrid, and went on to win a total of seven major titles between the two clubs; over 11 seasons in La Liga, where he also represented Racing de Santander, he amassed totals of 310 matches and 49 goals.

After five years as an assistant, Sánchez started working as a manager in 2015.

Club career

Real Madrid
Sánchez was born in Madrid. Being a product of the famous Real Madrid youth system, he made his first-team debut on 25 May 1996 in the season's last matchday, a 1–0 away win against Real Zaragoza.

Almost never a starter during his spell in the capital, Sánchez did appear in 36 La Liga games in 1996–97 (25 starts, five goals) as the Fabio Capello-led side won the national championship, and would play a relative role in Madrid's conquest of the following campaign's UEFA Champions League.

Deportivo
For 1998–99, Sánchez had to leave his hometown club as he faced stiff competition, and his first stop was Racing de Santander where he scored 12 top-division goals to earn a move to Deportivo de La Coruña. In the 1999–2000 season, he missed just one league match as they won the league – their first – netting four times.

It was as creator rather than scorer, however, that Sánchez impressed in the 2001–02 edition of the Champions League, a season which saw the Galicians win the Copa del Rey. He helped Depor to a third-place finish in 2002–03 with four goals in 30 games, adding a couple in the Champions League prior to the team's second group stage elimination.

Sánchez enjoyed his best return in front of goal in 2003–04, scoring seven from 31 appearances, including a 3 January 2004 hat-trick at neighbours RC Celta de Vigo (5–0 victory), as Deportivo finished third behind Valencia CF and FC Barcelona; he failed to find the net, though, in a Champions League campaign which concluded with a semi-final loss to FC Porto. In his last year, they would finish eighth in the league and the player was not offered a new contract, a decision helped by the fact he had recently been injured.

Later years
On 3 August 2006, Sánchez signed a two-year contract with Super League Greece giants Panathinaikos FC for about €1.5 million per year. He appeared sparingly throughout a sole season and, in October 2007, returned to Spain, penning a one-year deal with Segunda División club Elche CF; he had spent the previous weeks training on his own.

At the end of the campaign, Sánchez renewed his link for a further year, only to back down immediately on his original decision, leaving in July 2008. He retired at the age of 32 due to several injury problems, with nearly 500 competitive matches to his credit.

International career
Sánchez made his debut with Spain in a friendly with Germany on 16 August 2000 (4–1 away loss), and went on to receive eight caps in a four-year span. He had previously participated in the 1998 UEFA European Under-21 Championship, in which the nation emerged victorious 1–0 against Greece.

Coaching career
On 22 December 2010, Sánchez was named Getafe CF's assistant manager, replacing former Real Madrid teammate Juan Esnáider as sidekick of Míchel – another player he shared teams at the club with. On 9 April 2015 he returned to Deportivo, taking over from the sacked Víctor Fernández.

Sánchez was dismissed after the team finished 15th in his only full season, winning only twice in his last 22 games including an 0–8 home defeat to Barcelona. On 23 June 2016, he succeeded Marco Silva at the helm of Olympiacos FC. Less than two months later, after being ousted from the Champions League by Hapoel Be'er Sheva FC, he was relieved of his duties.

On 12 November 2016, Sánchez replaced the fired Gus Poyet at Real Betis. The following 9 May, he was himself relieved of his duties.

On 15 April 2019, after almost two years without a club, Sánchez took the place of the dismissed Juan Muñiz at Málaga CF. In early January 2020, with the team still in the second tier, the board of directors decided to suspend him indefinitely after a sex video featuring him leaked to the internet; shortly after, he was sacked.

Managerial statistics

Honours
Real Madrid
La Liga: 1996–97
Supercopa de España: 1997
UEFA Champions League: 1997–98

Deportivo
La Liga: 1999–2000
Copa del Rey: 2001–02
Supercopa de España: 2000, 2002

Spain U21
UEFA European Under-21 Championship: 1998

References

External links

1976 births
Living people
Spanish footballers
Footballers from Madrid
Association football midfielders
La Liga players
Segunda División players
Segunda División B players
Real Madrid C footballers
Real Madrid Castilla footballers
Real Madrid CF players
Racing de Santander players
Deportivo de La Coruña players
Elche CF players
Super League Greece players
Panathinaikos F.C. players
UEFA Champions League winning players
Spain under-21 international footballers
Spain international footballers
Spanish expatriate footballers
Expatriate footballers in Greece
Spanish expatriate sportspeople in Greece
Spanish football managers
La Liga managers
Segunda División managers
Deportivo de La Coruña managers
Real Betis managers
Málaga CF managers
Super League Greece managers
Olympiacos F.C. managers
Spanish expatriate football managers
Expatriate football managers in Greece